Kim Min-seo (born March 16, 1984) is a South Korean actress. She debuted as Kim Se-ha in the short-lived K-pop three-member girl group Mint, which was active from 1999–2000. When Mint disbanded, she turned to acting. Kim is best known for her role as a villainous queen consort in the period drama Moon Embracing the Sun (2012).

Filmography

Television series

Film

Music video

Variety show

Musical theatre

Awards and nominations

References

External links

 
 
 
 

South Korean television actresses
Living people
1984 births
South Korean film actresses
21st-century South Korean actresses
FNC Entertainment artists
South Korean female idols